The 2015–16 season of the Belgian Third Divisions is the 89th season of the third-tier football league in Belgium, since it was established in 1926.

Participating teams
The league is composed of 37 teams split into two groups of 18 and 19. Teams will play only other teams in their own division.

As a part of changes in the Belgian league system to be implemented in 2016, the Third Division was rebranded as First Amateur Division and contracted to 16 teams. The three-period rankings and promotion playoff between third and fourth tier teams were scrapped. The 11 (or 12) teams in each group relegate to the restructured fourth division called Second Amateur Division, while the last placers also relegate to the new fifth division called Third Amateur Division.

For the 2016–17 season onwards, the Amateur Superleague is made up of 16 teams, namely the nine relegated from the 2015–16 Second Division, the 2015–16 champion and runner-up of each Third Division group, the winner of qualifying playoffs contested by four teams in each group, and the winner of the match between losing playoff finalists. These teams must meet technical and administrative criteria.

Group A
 Acrenoise
 Bornem
 Eendracht Aalst
 FCV Dender EH
 Gent-Zeehaven
 FC Gullegem
 Hamme
 Izegem
 La Louvière Centre
 Londerzeel
 Olsa Brakel
 Oudenaarde
 Racing Mechelen
 Sint-Eloois-Winkel
 Sint-Niklase
 Sparta Petegem
 Temse
 Torhout

Group B
 Beerschot Wilrijk
 Berchem Sport
 Bocholter VV
 Cappellen
 Diegem Sport
 Grimbergen
 Hamoir
 Hasselt
 Hoogstraten
 Liège
 Oosterzonen Oosterwijk
 Rupel Boom
 Sprimont Comblain
 Tempo Overijse
 Tienen-Hageland
 Union La Calamine
 Walhain
 Wallonne Ciney
 Woluwe-Zaventem

League tables
Due to a reform in the Belgian football league, the Belgian Third Division ceases to exist and is replaced by the Belgian Second Amateur Division from the 2016–17 season, now at the fourth level of Belgian football. A newly created league, the Belgian First Amateur Division is formed at the third level, effectively pushing the teams in this division one level down the pyramid. Only the top two teams in each division and the two promotion playoff winners are "promoted" to the new league, meaning they will remain at the third level, while most of the teams effectively drop to the fourth level. The two teams finishing in last position in each group are relegated to the Belgian Third Amateur Division, which in fact means a drop from level 3 to level 5 of the pyramid.

Group A

Group B

Promotion play-offs
The eight teams taking part in the promotion play-offs are playing to win one of the three remaining places in the 2016-17 Belgian First Amateur Division. The final match between the winners of Round 2, Sprimont-Comblain and FCV Dender EH, was not played as both teams already achieved promotion by winning Round 2. Hasselt beat La Louvière Centre in the third place match and took the final promotion spot. The five losing teams will play in the 2016-17 Belgian Second Amateur Division, effectively one level lower than in the 2015-16 season.

References

Belgian Third Division
Bel
3